Calling Rastafari is a studio album by Jamaican reggae singer Burning Spear. It was released on August 24, 1999 through Heartbeat Records. Recording sessions took place at Grove Music Studio in Ocho Rios.

The album peaked at number 9 on the Reggae Albums chart in the United States. It won the Grammy Award for Best Reggae Album at the 42nd Annual Grammy Awards in 2000.

Track listing

Personnel 
Burning Band
Winston Rodney – vocals, percussion, arranger, producer, mixing
Stephen Stewart – keyboards
Num Heru-ur Shutef Amon'Tehu – percussion
Clyde Cummings – saxophone
James Smith – trumpet
Micah Robinson – trombone

Additional musicians
Ian "Beezy" Coleman – harmony vocals, lead guitar, rhythm guitar
Carol "Passion" Nelson – harmony vocals
Rochelle Bradshaw – harmony vocals
Yvonne Patrick – harmony vocals
Lesline Kidd – harmony vocals
Wayne Arnold – lead guitar
Chris Meridith – bass guitar
Shawn "Mark" Dawson – drums
Uziah "Sticky" Thompson – percussion
Howard "Saxy" Messam – saxophone
Chico Chin – trumpet

Technicals
Sonia Rodney – executive producer
Barry O'Hare – engineering, mixing
Toby Mountain – mastering
Joshua Blood – supervisor, lyric transcription
Anne Murdock – design
David Corio – photography

Chart history

References

External links

1999 albums
Burning Spear albums
Heartbeat Records albums
Grammy Award for Best Reggae Album